The European Low Gravity Research Association (ELGRA) is a non-profit international society devoted to the promotion of scientific research under various gravity conditions in Europe. The organization, established in 1979, provides a networking platform for all scientists interested in life and physical sciences and technology in space or on ground. ELGRA aims at representing and strengthening the scientific community of gravity-related research and helping young scientists and engineers get involved in low- and hyper-gravity research through educational programs.

Goals 

Since its creation, ELGRA has continuously encouraged and promoted low gravity research in both life and physical sciences within Europe with the permanent support of the European Space Agency. For several years ELGRA was a study group of the Parliamentary Assembly of the Council of Europe and contributed to a better visibility of Low Gravity research at the highest European spheres. However, its main action remains the improvement of the scientific collaboration between scientists from all over Europe in the field of low gravity research. In that effort, ELGRA has organized meetings and symposia resulting in 2019 in the 25th ELGRA symposium which gathered more than 150 scientists from all over the world. ELGRA also supports young researchers and students via grants and educational programs from ESA. The ELGRA community counts not less than 200 active members. The success of ELGRA reflects the increasing interest of the European scientific community for low gravity.  
Since the 80s, ELGRA's scientists have been using new research facilities either on the ground, as the 133m drop tower at ZARM (Bremem, Germany) or centrifuges (ESTEC, DLR, MEDES), but also in Parabolic flight (Novespace, Bordeaux, France), or in space with the European Columbus (ISS module) aboard the International Space Station dedicated to low gravity research. Nowadays, low gravity space research involves more and more scientists from all over Europe and space experiments require more preparation and especially a strong collaboration between the different partners. A collaboration platform dedicated to low gravity research as ELGRA remains crucial to facilitate this collaboration. Additionally, ELGRA joins both Physical as well as Life Sciences, what enhances translational research.

History 

All started in the late 70s with the advent of Spacelab and the possibility of research in low gravity environment on other platforms for microgravity research such as Ariane and TEXUS rockets. These new space facilities have provided scientist with a low effective gravitational field for prolonged periods for research in Life and Materials Sciences and led to a widening European interest in this fundamental research. However, at that time most scientists were working in isolation and it was for them very difficult to plan and manage a low gravity experiment considering operational complexity and the fact that experimenters were widely dispersed geographically.

In 1979, a group of seven scientists (Prof. F. Bonde-Petersen, Denmark, Dr. Y. Malméjac, France, Prof. L.G. Napolitano, Italy, Dr. J.F. Padday, UK, Dr. Stott, UK, Prof. H. Weiss, Germany and Dr. H.S. Wolff, UK) recognized the need for the European scientists involved in low gravity research to form an association to foster the cooperation and the coordination between them and to provide the ground-based expert advisory service for low gravity experiments.  On June 18, 1979 the "European Low Gravity Research Association" ELGRA was born.

ELGRA Symposium 

 2019 Granada / Spain: September 24 – 27, 2019
 2017 Juan-les-Pins / France: October 2 – 6, 2017 More. 
 2013 Rome / Vatican City: Sept. 11-14, 2013 More.
 2011 Antwerp /Belgium: Sept. 6–9, 2011 More.
 2010 Triest /Italy: More
 2009 Bonn / Germany: Sept. 1-4, 2009 More.
 2008 Angers / France: More
 2007 Florence / Italy: Sept. 4-7, 2007 More.
 2006 Toledo / Spain: June 27 – 30, 2006 More
 2005 Santorini / Greece: Sept. 21 – 23, 2005 More
 2003 München / Germany: April 2–4, 2003 More
 2001 Banyuls-sur-Mer / France : Sept. 25–28, 2001 More
 1999 Roma / Italy: 28 February - 3 March 1999 More
 1997 Paris / France: March 16–20, 1997
 1994 Madrid / Spain: December 11–14, 1994
 1993 Genova / Italy: April 5–7, 1993
 1992 München / Germany: April 2–3, 1992
 1991 Köln / Germany: April 16–18, 1991
 1990 Utrecht / Netherlands: April 9–11, 1990
 1989 Toulouse / France: March 29–31, 1989
 1987 Zürich / Switzerland: March 1–3, 1987
 1984 Noordwijk / Netherlands: January 11–13, 1984
 1982 Paris / France: October 4–5, 1982
 1981 Anacapri / Italy: September 14–15, 1981
 1980 Bad Alpbach / Austria: August 14–15, 1980

Management Committee 

The ELGRA Management Committee is elected every two years by ELGRA members during the Biennial Symposium and General Assembly.
It is composed of a President, a Vice-President, a Secretary, a Treasurer and three members. The President and Vice-President are chosen to represent the fields of physical and life science in gravity-related research.

Current ELGRA Management Committee

Former ELGRA Presidents 

    Monica Monici (2015-2017)
    Valentina Shevtsova (2011- 2015)
    Jack van Loon (2007–2011)
    Daniel Beysens (2003–2007)
    Marianne Cogoli-Greuter (1999–2003)
    Manuel G. Velarde (1997–1999)
    Gerard Perbal (1995–1997)
    Yves Malméjac (1993–1995)
    Jan P.B. Vreeburg (1989–1993)
    Augusto Cogoli (1986–1989)
    Luigi G. Napolitano (1981–1986)
    Herbert Weiss (1979–1981)

Educational activities 

 ELGRA is Committed with students and young scientists involved and interested in gravity-related research and technology through a range of actions:
 provide financial support to attend meetings and courses
 organize a student contest and student session in ELGRA meetings
 counsel and support space related student organizations such as LEEM
 support the Education Office of the European Space Agency in the promotion, selection and mentoring of the following educational programmes:
 Fly YourThesis!
 Drop YourThesis!
 Spin YourThesis!

See also 
 European Space Agency
 German Aerospace Center DLR
 CNES
 Parabolic flight
 Sounding rocket
 Drop tube

External links 
 ELGRA official website
 ESA
 NOVESPACE
 SELGRA

Gravity
Weightlessness